The 2019 Belgian Road Cycling Cup (known as the Bingoal Cycling Cup for sponsorship reasons) is the fourth edition of the Belgian Road Cycling Cup. Timothy Dupont is the defending champion.

Events
Several changes were made to the calendar compared to the previous season: Le Samyn, Dwars door West–Vlaanderen, the Heistse Pijl, the Grote Prijs Jef Scherens, the Eurométropole and Binche–Chimay–Binche no longer took part and were replaced by the Grote Prijs Jean-Pierre Monseré, the Circuit de Wallonie, the Schaal Sels and the Memorial Rik Van Steenbergen. As a result, the total number of races dropped from ten to eight.

Race results

Grote Prijs Jean-Pierre Monseré
Race cancelled due to storm.

Grote Prijs Marcel Kint

Circuit de Wallonie

Dwars door het Hageland

Halle–Ingooigem

Cup standings
Standings complete until after the Schaal Sels.

References

External links
  Official website

Belgian Road Cycling Cup
Belgian Road Cycling Cup
Road Cycling Cup